Lake Carmel is a hamlet and census-designated place in the town of Kent in Putnam County, New York,  United States. The home of over half of the town of Kent's population of 8,282, the hamlet is centered around Lake Carmel,  a 1.6 mile long manmade lake in the southeastern corner of the township and just north of hamlet of Carmel within the town of Carmel.

The lake and surrounding community was developed by the Smadbeck brothers, who excavated and dammed a swamp in the 1920s and sold lots through the now-defunct New York Daily Mirror. The hamlet is the seat of the volunteer Lake Carmel Fire Department; its fire district  covers the eastern half of the township, and of the Kent town government.

Geography
Lake Carmel is located at  (41.460268, -73.661663).

The community is west of Interstate 84, accessed at Exits 58 and 61. Lake Carmel mail can be addressed to Carmel or Kent Lakes as well as Lake Carmel.

Demographics

As of the census of 2000, there were 8,663 people, 3,019 households, and 2,351 families residing in the region. The population density was 1,678.0 per square mile (648.2/km2). There were 3,167 housing units at an average density of 613.4/sq mi (237.0/km2). The racial makeup of the CDP was 93.96% White, 1.50% African American, 0.17% Native American, 0.84% Asian, 0.02% Pacific Islander, 1.93% from other races, and 1.57% from two or more races. Hispanic or Latino of any race were 6.22% of the population.

There were 3,019 households, out of which 38.5% had children under the age of 18 living with them, 63.7% were married couples living together, 10.3% had a female householder with no husband present, and 22.1% were non-families. 17.0% of all households were made up of individuals, and 5.1% had someone living alone who was 65 years of age or older. The average household size was 2.87 and the average family size was 3.25.

In the community, the population was spread out, with 27.0% under the age of 18, 6.5% from 18 to 24, 33.1% from 25 to 44, 24.5% from 45 to 64, and 8.8% who were 65 years of age or older. The median age was 37 years. For every 100 females, there were 98.1 males. For every 100 females age 18 and over, there were 93.9 males.

The median income for a household in the area was $70,678, and the median income for a family was $76,514. Males had a median income of $49,615 versus $37,292 for females. The per capita income for the CDP was $27,253. About 3.9% of families and 3.8% of the population were below the poverty line, including 4.2% of those under age 18 and 6.9% of those age 65 or over.

References

Hamlets in New York (state)
Census-designated places in New York (state)
Census-designated places in Putnam County, New York
Hamlets in Putnam County, New York